Naor Abudi (born July 17, 1993) is an Israeli footballer who plays as an attacking midfielder for Israeli club Hapoel Nof HaGalil.

External links
 
 

1993 births
Living people
Israeli footballers
Hapoel Ironi Kiryat Shmona F.C. players
Hapoel Nof HaGalil F.C. players
Ironi Nesher F.C. players
Hapoel Acre F.C. players
F.C. Ashdod players
FC Lori players
Hapoel Umm al-Fahm F.C. players
Hapoel Afula F.C. players
Israeli Premier League players
Liga Leumit players
Armenian Premier League players
Israeli expatriate footballers
Expatriate footballers in Armenia
Israeli expatriate sportspeople in Armenia
Footballers from Kiryat Shmona
Association football midfielders